This article lists all television programming produced for release on Paramount+, formerly known as CBS All Access, an American over-the-top subscription video on demand service owned and operated by Paramount Streaming, a division of Paramount Global. It features television shows, miniseries and specials from the libraries of CBS and Paramount Global as a whole, along with live streams of CBS for local affiliates in the United States pending availability.

Original programming

Drama

Comedy

Animation

Adult animation

Kids & family

Unscripted

Docuseries

Reality

Variety

Co-productions

Continuations

Specials

Regional original programming 
These shows are originals, because Paramount+ commissioned or acquired them and had their premiere on the service, but they are not available worldwide.

English language

Non-English language

German

Portuguese

Spanish

Co-productions

Specials

Upcoming original programming

Drama

Comedy

Animation

Adult animation

Kids & family

Unscripted

Docuseries

Reality

Variety

Co-productions

Continuations

Specials

Regional original programming 
These shows are originals, because Paramount+ commissioned or acquired them and had their premiere on the service, but they are not available worldwide.

English language

Non-English language

French

German

Italian

Portuguese

Spanish

In development

Notes

References 

 
Lists of television series by streaming service
Paramount Global-related lists